Gorod is a technical death metal band from Bordeaux, France.

History 
Gorod originally formed in 1997 under the name Gorgasm, but later changed their named to Gorod in 2005, to avoid confusion with an American death metal band of the same name. They released their debut album Neurotripsicks on Deadsun Records in 2004, which was later re-released by Willowtip Records a year after. They later followed up with Leading Vision in 2006. Their original drummer, Sandrine Bourguignon would also leave the band around this time.

In 2008, Gorod announced they had written six new songs, which were to be a part of their upcoming album. In May 2009, the band announced their new album Process of a New Decline as well as releasing another track from that album, "Programmers of Decline" on their Myspace as well. The album was released a month after to fairly moderate critical acclaim. This album would also be their last with their original vocalist Guillaume Martinot, who would later be replaced by Julien Deyres. The band would join the Maryland Deathfest festival in support the album.

In December 2011, the band announced they began mixing their new album, as well as joining Obscura on tour for their 2011 album, Omnivium alongside Spawn of Possession and Exivious. It was later announced a year after that they inked a new North American record deal with Unique Leader Records, and released new details of their album A Perfect Absolution, which was released a month after its initial announcement. A year after the album's release, the band would headline the ninth annual Bloodletting North America tour. The band would also be seeing themselves part ways with their second drummer, Samuel Santiago.

On October 2, 2015, Gorod released studio footage for their album A Maze of Recycled Creeds, which would be released fourteen days later, as well as being their last release with Unique Leader. The band would follow up that success with another album Aethra, released October 2018.

In February 2022, the band released a new single Victory presumably from their new studio album. Two more singles would be released as follow-ups, Breeding Silence and The Orb released in July and September respectively. In February 2023, the band announced their seventh album, The Orb, would be released on March 10.

Discography 
Studio albums
 Neurotripsicks (2005)
 Leading Vision (2006)
 Process of a New Decline (2009)
 A Perfect Absolution (2012)
 A Maze of Recycled Creeds (2015)
 Æthra (2018)
 The Orb (2023)
EPs
 Embalmed Madness split (2005)
Transcendence (2011) 
Kiss the Freak (2017)
Demos
 Gorgasm Demo (2000)
 Promo 2002 (2002)

Band members

Current members 
 Mathieu Pascal – guitar (1997–present)
 Benoit Claus – bass (1997–present)
 Julien "Nutz" Deyres – vocals (2010–present)
 Nicolas Alberny – guitar (2010–present)
 Karol Diers – drums (2014–present)

Former members 
 Sandrine Bourguignon – drums (1997–2008)
 Guillaume Martinot – vocals (1997–2010)
 Arnaud Pontacq – guitar (2002–2010) 
 Samuel Santiago – drums (2008–2013)

Timeline

References

External links

Official websites 
 Gorod official homepage
 Gorod official myspace
 Gorod at Willowtip Records
 Official Gorod Forum at SMNnews

Gorod at online databases 
 Gorod at Encyclopaedia Metallum
 Gorod at Last.fm

Technical death metal musical groups
Musical groups established in 2005
French death metal musical groups
Musical quintets
Musical groups from Bordeaux
Listenable Records artists